Teams in the National Collegiate Athletic Association (NCAA) retire jersey numbers of players who either are considered by the team to have made significant contributions to that team's success, or who have experienced untimely deaths during their playing career. As with other leagues, once a team retires a player's jersey number, it never issues the number to any other player, unless the player or team explicitly allows it.

History 
Since NCAA teams began retiring numbers, many players have had their jersey number retired. Duke University has the most retired numbers of the team with 13. Unlike professional leagues, no one player has had his number retired by two teams.

Some programs such as Indiana, Kansas, Syracuse, Oklahoma State, Georgetown, Stanford, Maryland, or Baylor, have not officially retired jersey numbers yet. Unlike major sports leagues in the United States such as MLB (which retired Jackie Robinson's number 42) and the NHL (which did so for Wayne Gretzky's 99), the NCAA has never retired a jersey number league-wide in honor of anyone.

Nevertheless, there are some cases of retirement of a same number honoring two different players, such as the University of Texas at El Paso, which retired number 14 worn first by Bobby Joe Hill (1961–1966) and then by Nate "Tiny" Archibald (1967–70).

Retired numbers 

Notes

References 

r
nc